Bogorodsky (masculine), Bogorodskaya (feminine), or Bogorodskoye (neuter) may refer to:
Bogorodsky District, several districts in Russia
Bogorodskoye District, a district in Eastern Administrative Okrug of Moscow, Russia
Bogorodskoye Urban Settlement, several municipal urban settlements in Russia
Bogorodsky (inhabited locality) (Bogorodskoye, Bogorodskaya), several inhabited localities in Russia

See also
Bogorodsk
Bogoroditsky (disambiguation)
Bogoroditsk